Jerry Wilson may refer to:

 Jerry Wilson, founder of Soloflex
 Jerry Wilson (ice hockey) (1937–2011), Canadian ice hockey forward
 Jerry Wilson (defensive back) (born 1973), former American football safety
 Jerry Wilson (defensive end) (1936–2015), American football defensive end
 Jerry Wilson (sailor), Canadian Olympian